Karan K.C. (born 10 October 1991) is a Nepalese professional cricketer. He was one of the eleven cricketers to play in Nepal's first ever One Day International (ODI) match, against the Netherlands, in August 2018.

Karan guided Nepal to a one-wicket victory against Canada in their final match of the 2018 ICC World Cricket League Division Two in Windhoek, Namibia on 14 February 2018. The victory ensured Nepal a berth for 2018 Cricket World Cup Qualifier to be held in March in Zimbabwe.

Karan is a right-handed batsman and a right-arm Fast-Medium bowler. He made his debut for Nepal against Uganda in January 2015.

He represents the Region no. 8 Pokhara of the National League, Panchakanya Tej of the Everest Premier League and Pentagon International College, which plays in the SPA Cup. He represented Panchakanya Tej in the Everest Premier League, 2016.

Playing career 
Karan was born in Baglung and brought up in Chandigarh, India.

He represented Panchakanya Tej in the 2014 Nepal Premier League, where he picked up 10 wickets from the 7 matches at an average of 13.40.

He was selected in the 18 man preliminary squad for the 2014 ICC World Cricket League Division Three but did not make it to the final squad. Subsequent to that, he went India along with his teammate Aarif Sheikh in September 2014 for a 10-day training camp at Just Cricket Academy in Bangalore.

He toured Sri Lanka along with the team in November 2014 where he played two three-day matches against Sri Lanka Cricket Combined XI.

He made his List A debut in 2015 ICC World Cricket League Division Two in Namibia in January 2015. Playing his first tournament for Nepal, he picked up 9 wickets in 6 matches at an average of 15.88 and an economy of 3.31, including a five-wicket haul against Canada, which is the best bowling figures of a Nepalese bowler in the List A format.

He made his Twenty20 International debut for Nepal against the Netherlands on 30 June 2015.

Karan scored 42 runs, remaining unbeaten in the must-win match against Canada, helping Nepal win the match on the last ball. This victory allowed Nepal to qualify for the 2018 Cricket World Cup Qualifier. He was adjudged man of the match for the last wicket partnership of 51 runs with Sandeep Lamichhane.

In July 2018, he was named in Nepal's squad for their One Day International (ODI) series against the Netherlands. These were Nepal's first ODI matches since gaining ODI status during the 2018 Cricket World Cup Qualifier. He made his ODI debut for Nepal against the Netherlands on 1 August 2018.

In August 2018, he was named in Nepal's squad for the 2018 Asia Cup Qualifier tournament. In October 2018, he was named in Nepal's squad in the Eastern sub-regional group for the 2018–19 ICC World Twenty20 Asia Qualifier tournament. In June 2019, he was named in Nepal's squad for the Regional Finals of the 2018–19 ICC T20 World Cup Asia Qualifier tournament. In September 2019, he was named in Nepal's squad for the 2019-20 Singapore Tri-Nation Series and 2019-20 Oman Pentangular Series. In the match against Netherlands in the Pentangular Series, he took 4 wickets for 17 runs, and played a match-winning knock of 31 not out.

He made his first-class debut on 6 November 2019, for Nepal against the Marylebone Cricket Club (MCC), during the MCC's tour of Nepal. Later the same month, he was named in Nepal's squads for the 2019 ACC Emerging Teams Asia Cup in Bangladesh, and for the cricket tournament at the 2019 South Asian Games. The Nepal team won the bronze medal, after they beat the Maldives by five wickets in the third-place playoff match. In September 2020, he was one of eighteen cricketers to be awarded with a central contract by the Cricket Association of Nepal.

References

External links 

 Karan KC's Facebook Profile

1991 births
Living people
People from Baglung District
Nepalese cricketers
Nepal One Day International cricketers
Nepal Twenty20 International cricketers
Twenty20 International hat-trick takers
South Asian Games bronze medalists for Nepal
South Asian Games medalists in cricket